In the nervous system, a synapse is a structure that permits a neuron (or nerve cell) to pass an electrical or chemical signal to another neuron or to the target effector cell.

Synapses are essential to the transmission of nervous impulses from one neuron to another. Neurons are specialized to pass signals to individual target cells, and synapses are the means by which they do so. At a synapse, the plasma membrane of the signal-passing neuron (the presynaptic neuron) comes into close apposition with the membrane of the target (postsynaptic) cell. Both the presynaptic and postsynaptic sites contain extensive arrays of molecular machinery that link the two membranes together and carry out the signaling process. In many synapses, the presynaptic part is located on an axon and the postsynaptic part is located on a dendrite or soma. Astrocytes also exchange information with the synaptic neurons, responding to synaptic activity and, in turn, regulating neurotransmission. Synapses (at least chemical synapses) are stabilized in position by synaptic adhesion molecules (SAMs) projecting from both the pre- and post-synaptic neuron and sticking together where they overlap; SAMs may also assist in the generation and functioning of synapses.

History
Santiago Ramón y Cajal proposed that neurons are not continuous throughout the body, yet still communicate with each other, an idea known as the neuron doctrine. The word "synapse" was introduced in 1897 by the English neurophysiologist Charles Sherrington in Michael Foster's Textbook of Physiology. Sherrington struggled to find a good term that emphasized a union between two separate elements, and the actual term "synapse" was suggested by the English classical scholar Arthur Woollgar Verrall, a friend of Foster. The word was derived from the Greek synapsis, meaning "conjunction", which in turn derives from synaptein, from syn "together" and haptein "to fasten".

However, while the synaptic gap remained a theoretical construct, and sometimes reported as a discontinuity between contiguous axonal terminations and dendrites or cell bodies, histological methods using the best light microscopes of the day could not visually resolve their separation which is now known to be about 20nm. It needed the electron microscope in the 1950s to show the finer structure of the synapse with its separate, parallel pre- and postsynaptic membranes and processes, and the cleft between the two.

Chemical and electrical synapses

There are two fundamentally different types of synapses:
 In a chemical synapse, electrical activity in the presynaptic neuron is converted (via the activation of voltage-gated calcium channels) into the release of a chemical called a neurotransmitter that binds to receptors located in the plasma membrane of the postsynaptic cell. The neurotransmitter may initiate an electrical response or a secondary messenger pathway that may either excite or inhibit the postsynaptic neuron. Chemical synapses can be classified according to the neurotransmitter released: glutamatergic (often excitatory), GABAergic (often inhibitory), cholinergic (e.g. vertebrate neuromuscular junction), and adrenergic (releasing norepinephrine). Because of the complexity of receptor signal transduction, chemical synapses can have complex effects on the postsynaptic cell.
 In an electrical synapse, the presynaptic and postsynaptic cell membranes are connected by special channels called gap junctions that are capable of passing an electric current, causing voltage changes in the presynaptic cell to induce voltage changes in the postsynaptic cell. The main advantage of an electrical synapse is the rapid transfer of signals from one cell to the next.

Synaptic communication is distinct from an ephaptic coupling, in which communication between neurons occurs via indirect electric fields.

An autapse is a chemical or electrical synapse that forms when the axon of one neuron synapses onto dendrites of the same neuron.

Types of interfaces

Synapses can be classified by the type of cellular structures serving as the pre- and post-synaptic components. The vast majority of synapses in the mammalian nervous system are classical axo-dendritic synapses (axon synapsing upon a dendrite), however, a variety of other arrangements exist. These include but are not limited to axo-axonic, dendro-dendritic, axo-secretory, axo-ciliary, somato-dendritic, dendro-somatic, and somato-somatic synapses.

The axon can synapse onto a dendrite, onto a cell body, or onto another axon or axon terminal, as well as into the bloodstream or diffusely into the adjacent nervous tissue.

Role in memory

It is widely accepted that the synapse plays a role in the formation of memory. As neurotransmitters activate receptors across the synaptic cleft, the connection between the two neurons is strengthened when both neurons are active at the same time, as a result of the receptor's signaling mechanisms. The strength of two connected neural pathways is thought to result in the storage of information, resulting in memory. This process of synaptic strengthening is known as long-term potentiation.

By altering the release of neurotransmitters, the plasticity of synapses can be controlled in the presynaptic cell. The postsynaptic cell can be regulated by altering the function and number of its receptors. Changes in postsynaptic signaling are most commonly associated with a N-methyl-d-aspartic acid receptor (NMDAR)-dependent long-term potentiation (LTP) and long-term depression (LTD) due to the influx of calcium into the post-synaptic cell, which are the most analyzed forms of plasticity at excitatory synapses.

Study models
For technical reasons, synaptic structure and function have been historically studied at unusually large model synapses, for example:
 Squid giant synapse
 Neuromuscular junction (NMJ), a cholinergic synapse in vertebrates, glutamatergic in insects
 Ciliary calyx in the ciliary ganglion of chicks
 Calyx of Held in the brainstem
 Ribbon synapse in the retina
 Schaffer collateral synapses in the hippocampus. These synapses are small, but their pre- and postsynaptic neurons are well separated (CA3 and CA1, respectively).

Synaptic polarization
The function of neurons depends upon cell polarity. The distinctive structure of nerve cells allows action potentials to travel directionally (from dendrites to cell body down the axon), and for these signals to then be received and carried on by post-synaptic neurons or received by effector cells. Nerve cells have long been used as models for cellular polarization, and of particular interest are the mechanisms underlying the polarized localization of synaptic molecules. PIP2 signaling regulated by IMPase plays an integral role in synaptic polarity.

Phosphoinositides (PIP, PIP2, and PIP3) are molecules that have been shown to affect neuronal polarity. A gene (ttx-7) was identified in Caenorhabditis elegans that encodes myo-inositol monophosphatase (IMPase), an enzyme that produces inositol by dephosphorylating inositol phosphate. Organisms with mutant ttx-7 genes demonstrated behavioral and localization defects, which were rescued by expression of IMPase. This led to the conclusion that IMPase is required for the correct localization of synaptic protein components. The egl-8 gene encodes a homolog of phospholipase Cβ (PLCβ), an enzyme that cleaves PIP2. When ttx-7 mutants also had a mutant egl-8 gene, the defects caused by the faulty ttx-7 gene were largely reversed. These results suggest that PIP2 signaling establishes polarized localization of synaptic components in living neurons.

Presynaptic modulation 
Modulation of neurotransmitter release by G-protein-coupled receptors (GPCRs) is a prominent presynaptic mechanism for regulation of synaptic transmission. The activation of GPCRs located at the presynaptic terminal, can decrease the probability of neurotransmitter release. This presynaptic depression involves activation of Gi/o-type G-proteins that mediate different inhibitory mechanisms, including inhibition of voltage-gated calcium channels, activation of potassium channels, and direct inhibition of the vesicle fusion process. Endocannabinoids, synthesized in and released from postsynaptic neuronal elements, and their cognate receptors, including the (GPCR) CB1 receptor, located at the presynaptic terminal, are involved in this modulation by an retrograde signaling process, in which these compounds are synthesized in and released from postsynaptic neuronal elements, and travel back to the presynaptic terminal to act on the CB1 receptor for short-term (STD) or long-term synaptic depression (LTD), that cause a short or long lasting decrease in neurotransmitter release.

Additional images

See also

 Active zone
 Autapse
 Exocytosis
 Immunological synapse
 Neurotransmitter vesicle
 Postsynaptic density
 Synaptopathy

References

Signal transduction